The Slade Hotel, built in 1891 in Adrian, Minnesota, United States, is an example of Late Victorian architecture.  Its historic qualities were recognized by listing of the structure on the National Register of Historic Places in 1975.

In the 1990s the structure was examined and a recommendation was made for demolition.  Instead, it was converted into senior housing according to plans by Oertel Architects of St. Paul, Minnesota. Although hotel rooms were combined into apartments, HVAC systems were upgraded or replaced, and other changes were made in the 1997 renovation, it preserved its historic character and designation.

The Slade Hotel was the Minnesota Brick Structure of the Month for September 2010.

References

Buildings and structures in Nobles County, Minnesota
Hotel buildings completed in 1891
Hotel buildings on the National Register of Historic Places in Minnesota
Defunct hotels in Minnesota
National Register of Historic Places in Nobles County, Minnesota
Victorian architecture in Minnesota